E. P. "Tom" Sawyer State Park is a  Kentucky state park located in the Freys Hill area of Louisville, Kentucky, on former land of Kentucky's Central State Hospital. When opened in 1974, it was named in honor of Republican Jefferson County Judge/Executive Erbon Powers "Tom" Sawyer who was killed in a car accident on Louisville's Interstate 64 in 1969 while still in office. Sawyer was the father of journalist Diane Sawyer.

Activities and amenities
The park's amenities include an activities center with a gymnasium that has indoor courts for badminton, basketball, and volleyball as well as an Olympic-sized swimming pool and weight room.  The park also has 12 tennis courts (which used to be lighted but the lights have been removed), 14 soccer fields, 3 lighted softball fields, a mile-long fitness trail, a 1¼ mile nature trail, a permanent BMX track, a model aircraft airfield, a dog park, playgrounds, and picnic facilities. The park is also the site of the Louisville Astronomical Society's "Urban Astronomy Center."

In the news
In 2004, Louisville officials suggested that Otter Creek Park, a  city-operated park lying outside of Louisville's city limits, become a state park in an exchange for E. P. "Tom" Sawyer State Park becoming a city park. In 2010, the state took over Otter Creek Park in a separate deal and it reopened in 2011 as an outdoor recreation area operated by the Kentucky Department of Fish and Wildlife Resources.

See also
List of attractions and events in the Louisville metropolitan area
List of parks in the Louisville metropolitan area

Further reading

References

State parks of Kentucky
Parks in Louisville, Kentucky
Dog parks in the United States
Protected areas established in 1974
1974 establishments in Kentucky